Thyrsopsocus is a genus of Psocoptera in the family Psocidae.

References

External links 
 
 Thyrsopsocus at insectoid.info

Psocomorpha genera
Psocidae